is a Japanese manga by Satosumi Takaguchi serialized in Monthly Asuka. It was adapted into a television drama series, two live action films, two OVAs and two drama CDs. It is one of the series with delinquent girls (sukeban) popular in the 1980s. Two new manga series were published, one from 2003 to 2009 and the other from 2007 to 2008.

Recently, in July 2019, a new manga series was released called Hana no Asukagumi! Infinity and it ended on November 7, 2021.

Reception 
More than 10 million copies were sold of the manga by November 2005.

Media adaptations

Anime
There are two OVAs: Shin Kabukicho Story Hana no Asuka-gumi!, released on June 12, 1987 and Hana no Asuka-gumi! Lonely Cats Battle Royale, released in 1990. Lonely Cats Battle Royale was thought to be lost until an anonymous individual mailed a tape of the OVA to  anime enthusiast Kenny Lauderdale in 2019.

TV drama

A television drama series was broadcast on Fuji Television from April 11 to September 26, 1988.

Cast
Megumi Odaka as Asuka Kuraku
Natsuki Ozawa as Miko Dōmoto
Hikari Ishida as Harumi Kōzuki
Shiori Sakura as Hibari
Risa Honda as Kasuga
Masami Hayami as Kaze
Mika Chiba as Hayashi
Emi Wakui as Hi
Kyōko Ninagawa as Yama
Megumi Ishii as Kyōko Kuraku

Live action films
Two live action films have been produced: the first, directed by Yōichi Sai and released on August 13, 1988 and the second, Hana no Asuka-gumi! Neo, directed by Yutaka Tsurita and released on April 25, 2009.

References

External links
New Hana no Asuka-gumi! at Shodensha 

Hana no Asuga Kumi BS Hen on CDJapan

1985 manga
1987 anime OVAs
1988 Japanese television series debuts
1990 anime OVAs
2003 manga
2007 manga
Japanese drama television series
Japanese television dramas based on manga
Japanese webcomics
Josei manga
Juvenile delinquency in fiction
Kadokawa Shoten manga
Live-action films based on manga
Manga adapted into films
Shodensha manga
Shōjo manga
Webcomics in print